The 1985–86 Illinois Fighting Illini men's basketball team represented the University of Illiniois.

Regular season
Junior college transfer Ken Norman highlighted the 1985-86 season as he set the school record for single-season field-goal percentage (.641).

Roster

Source

Schedule
												
Source																
												

|-
!colspan=12 style="background:#DF4E38; color:white;"| Non-Conference regular season

	

|-
!colspan=9 style="background:#DF4E38; color:#FFFFFF;"|Big Ten regular season	

|-
!colspan=9 style="text-align: center; background:#DF4E38"|NCAA Tournament

|-

Player stats

Awards and honors
 Bruce Douglas
Big Ten Defensive Player of the Year
Fighting Illini All-Century team (2005)
Ken Norman 
Team Most Valuable Player 
Fighting Illini All-Century team (2005)

Team players drafted into the NBA

Rankings

References

Illinois Fighting Illini
Illinois Fighting Illini men's basketball seasons
Illinois
1985 in sports in Illinois
1986 in sports in Illinois